Berton Churchill (December 9, 1876 – October 10, 1940) was a Canadian stage and film actor.

Early years
Churchill was born in Toronto, Ontario. After his family moved to New York City, he graduated from high school there, studied law at night, and was a weekly participant in the William J. Florence Dramatic Society in Jersey City. 
As a young man interested in the theater, he appeared in stock companies as early as 1903 and worked as a newspaper pressman, eventually becoming a foreman and leader of his union. Progressing in his acting, he began performing with the Berkely Lyceum.

Career 
Churchill acted for two years with a traveling repertory company, developing skills that eventually took him to Broadway. The death of his father caused him to return home to work as a press foreman. Eventually he returned to acting in small parts. His career received a boost when E. F. Albee saw him perform in Boston. Albee added him to his summer stock company at Pawtucket, where Churchill continued to perform almost every summer for at least two decades.

His first performance on Broadway was in The Barber of New Orleans (1909), and his last was in Five Star Final (1930). 

He was one of the earliest members of Actors Equity and sat on the union's Council. In 1919, he was in charge of the New York headquarters during the Equity strike.

Around 1929, Churchill began to perform in motion pictures. Following the use of sound in film, he moved to Hollywood, California. There, he landed numerous supporting roles, usually as the stern or pompous character with such roles as a banker, a state governor, or a land baron. He was much in demand, "establishing what was believed to be a record by appearing in 34 in 1932 alone." In more than 125 films, Churchill worked for some of the great directors such as Otto Preminger, John Ford, and Frank Capra. As well, he performed with many of the most famous stars of the day, such as Bette Davis (The Cabin in the Cotton), Jeanette MacDonald, Tyrone Power, Edward G. Robinson, and  Will Rogers. Churchill is perhaps best known for his role as Gatewood, the absconding banker in John Ford's highly acclaimed 1939 film Stagecoach, starring John Wayne.

In 1925, Churchill helped found the Masquers club that led to him and five other actors creating the Screen Actors Guild in 1933.

Death 
Churchill died in Medical Arts Center Hospital in New York City, of uremic poisoning. His body was returned to the west coast to be interred in the Forest Lawn Memorial Park in Glendale, California.

Selected filmography

 The Road Called Straight (1919) as Robert Swiftmore
 Six Cylinder Love (1923) as George Stapleton
 Tongues of Flame (1924) as Boland
 Nothing But the Truth (1929) as E.M. Burke
 Tarnished Lady (1931) as Stock Speculator (uncredited)
 Secrets of a Secretary (1931) as Mr. Merritt
 My Sin (1931) as Mr. Osgood (uncredited)
 Husband's Holiday (1931) as Gerald Burgess
 Air Eagles (1931) as Windy J. Bailey
 This Reckless Age (1932) as Banker
 Taxi! (1932) as Judge West (uncredited)
 Impatient Maiden (1932)
 Cheaters at Play (1932)
 A Fool's Advice (1932) as Mayor Martin Sloan
 The Wet Parade (1932) as Roger's Uncle Dick (uncredited)
 Scandal for Sale (1932) as Bunnyweather
 It's Tough to Be Famous (1932) as Admiral Blaine (uncredited)
 The Mouthpiece (1932) as Judge, Rocco Trial (uncredited)
 Two Seconds (1932) as The Warden
 The Rich Are Always with Us (1932) as Judge Bradshaw
 Forgotten Commandments (1932) as Minor Role (scenes deleted)
 The Dark Horse (1932) as William A. Underwood
 Week Ends Only (1932) as A.S. Carr
 Fast Companions (1932) as Committee Chairman
 The Washington Masquerade (1932) as Sen. Bitler
 American Madness (1932) as O'Brien (uncredited)
 Okay, America! (1932) as Jacob Baron
 The Crooked Circle (1932) as Col. Walters
 The Cabin in the Cotton (1932) as Lane Norwood
 The Big Stampede (1932) as Gov. Wallace
 False Faces (1932) as Dr. John B. Parker
 Washington Merry-Go-Round (1932) as Speaker
 I Am a Fugitive from a Chain Gang (1932) as The Judge
 Afraid to Talk (1932) as Mayor William 'Billy' Manning
 If I Had a Million (1932) as Warden (uncredited)
 Madame Butterfly (1932) as American Consul
 Frisco Jenny (1932) as Judge Thomas B. Reynolds (uncredited)
 The Billion Dollar Scandal (1933) as The Warden
 Laughter in Hell (1933) as Mike Slaney
 The Mysterious Rider (1933) as Mark King
 Employees' Entrance (1933) as Mr. Bradford (uncredited)
 Hard to Handle (1933) as Col. H.D.X. Wells (uncredited)
 From Hell to Heaven (1933) as Toledo Jones
 Private Jones (1933) as Roger Winthrop
 The Little Giant (1933) as Donald Hadley Cass
 So This Is Africa (1933) as Movie Producer
 Elmer, the Great (1933) as Colonel Moffitt
 Heroes for Sale (1933) as Mr. Winston
 I Love That Man (1933) as Mordant - Casket Buyer
 Her First Mate (1933) as Davis
 The Big Brain (1933) as Col. Higginbotham
 The Avenger (1933) as Forster
 Doctor Bull (1933) as Herbert Banning - Janet's Brother
 Golden Harvest (1933) as Eben Martin
 Ladies Must Love (1933) as Gaskins
 Only Yesterday (1933) as Goodheart (uncredited)
 College Coach (1933) as Otis
 Master of Men (1933) as Mr. Walling
 Frontier Marshal (1934) as Ben 'Hiram' Melton
 Hi, Nellie! (1934) as Graham
 Men in White (1934) as John Hudson (uncredited)
 Let's Be Ritzy (1934) as R.M. Pembrook
 Strictly Dynamite (1934) as Mr. Rivers
 Half a Sinner (1934) as Deacon Caswell (aka Alias the Deacon)
 Murder in the Private Car (1934) as Luke Carson
 Bachelor Bait (1934) as 'Big' Barney Nolan
 Friends of Mr. Sweeney (1934) as Franklyn P. Brumbaugh
 Dames (1934) as Harold Ellsworthy Todd
 Take the Stand (1934) as Mr. Jerome Burbank
 Judge Priest (1934) as Senator Horace Maydew
 Redhead (1934) as Mr. Brown
 Kid Millions (1934) as Col. Harrison Larrabee
 Menace (1934) as Norman Bellamy
 Babbitt (1934) as Judge Virgil 'Verge' Thompson
 Sing Sing Nights (1934) as Governor Duane
 Bachelor of Arts (1934) as Alexander Hamilton Sr.
 Life Is Worth Living (1934)
 Helldorado (1935) as 'Clarion' Editor
 The County Chairman (1935) as Elias Rigby
 A Night at the Ritz (1935) as Stephen Vincent
 Vagabond Lady (1935) as R.D. Spear
 $10 Raise (1935) as Mr. Bates
 Dizzy Dames (1935) as Dad Hackett
 Page Miss Glory (1935) as Mr. Yates - Assistant Hotel Manager
 Steamboat Round the Bend  (1935) as New Moses
 I Live for Love (1935) as Fabian
 The Spanish Cape Mystery (1935) as Judge Macklin
 The Rainmakers (1935) as Simon Parker
 Coronado (1935) as Walter Marvin
 Black Gold (1936) as J.C. Anderson
 You May Be Next (1936) as J.J. Held
 The Dark Hour (1936) as Paul Bernard
 Colleen (1936) as Logan
 Three of a Kind (1936) as 'Con' Cornelius
 Parole! (1936) as Rex Gavin
 Bunker Bean (1936) as Professor Ed Balthazer
 Dimples (1936) as Col. Loring
 Under Your Spell (1936) as Judge
 Racing Lady (1937) as Judge
 Parnell (1937) as The O'Gorman Mahon
 Sing and Be Happy (1937) as John Mason
 You Can't Beat Love (1937) as Police Chief Brennan
 The Singing Marine (1937) as J. Montgomery Madison
 Public Wedding (1937) as H. Theodore Lane aka Pop
 Wild and Woolly (1937) as Edward Ralston
 Quick Money (1937) as Bluford H. Smythe
 In Old Chicago (1938) as Senator Colby
 He Couldn't Say No (1938) as Senator Mabby
 Wide Open Faces (1938) as L.D. Crawford
 Four Men and a Prayer (1938) as Mr. Martin Cherrington
 Kentucky Moonshine (1938) as J.B
 Ladies in Distress (1938) as Fred Morgan
 Danger on the Air (1938) as Caesar Kluck
 Down in 'Arkansaw' (1938) as Judge
 The Cowboy and the Lady (1938) as Henderson
 Sweethearts (1938) as Sheridan
 Stagecoach (1939) as Ellsworth Henry Gatewood
 So This Is London (1939) as Hiram Draper
 Daughters Courageous (1939) as Judge Henry Hornsby
 Should Husbands Work? (1939) as Barnes
 The Angels Wash Their Faces (1939) as Mayor Dooley
 Hero foe a Day (1939) as E. A. Dow
 On Your Toes (1939) as Donald Henderson
 Brother Rat and a Baby (1940) as Mr. Norman
 20 Mule Team (1940) as 'Jackass' Brown
 Saturday's Children (1940) as Mr. Norman
 Turnabout (1940) as Julian Marlowe
 The Way of All Flesh (1940) as Reginald L. Morten
 Cross-Country Romance (1940) as Col. Conway
 Public Deb No. 1 (1940) as Magistrate
 I'm Nobody's Sweetheart Now (1940) as Senator Henry Lowell (final film role)

See also

Canadian pioneers in early Hollywood

References

External links

Canadian male stage actors
Canadian male film actors
Canadian expatriate male actors in the United States
Male actors from Toronto
1876 births
1940 deaths
Deaths from urologic disease
Burials at Forest Lawn Memorial Park (Glendale)
20th-century Canadian male actors